Dalechampia capensis is a species of shrub. It is known by the common names inzula or wild hop.

It is native to Botswana, South Africa, Mozambique, Eswatini, Tanzania, and Zambia. The species is eaten by larval Byblia ilithyia and Eurytela dryope.

References 

Plukenetieae
Flora of Southern Africa